Mary Utopia Rothrock (September 19, 1890 – January 30, 1976), was an American librarian and historian.

Born in Brick Church in Giles County, Tennessee, Rothrock grew up Trenton, Tennessee. She was the youngest of five children of John Rothrock, a Presbyterian minister, and his wife, Utopia (Herron) Rothrock.  She attended public schools in Milan, Tennessee, and Somerville, Tennessee, and the Ward Seminary in Nashville.  She graduated from Vanderbilt University in 1912 with a Master of Science degree, and the New York School of Library Science in Albany in 1914.  While in New York, she worked as an assistant at the New York State Library.  Rothrock returned to Tennessee in 1915 to serve as Head of Circulation at the Cossitt Library in Memphis.

In 1916, Knoxville businessman and philanthropist Calvin M. McClung persuaded her to move to Knoxville to be Chief Librarian of the Lawson McGhee Library.  She served in that position until 1933. During her tenure, she oversaw the establishment of the branch system that would later evolve into the Knox County Public Library system. She was also instrumental in persuading McClung to donate his personal collection to the library system, creating the Calvin M. McClung Historical Collection.  This collection provided the core of the East Tennessee Historical Society (ETHS), of which Rothrock was a charter member.

Rothrock supervised the Tennessee Valley Authority libraries from 1934 to 1948.    She afterward returned to the Knox County Library system, working as the Knox County Librarian from 1949 to 1955.  After retiring, she remained active with the library system in some capacity until her death in 1976.

Rothrock wrote and edited numerous historical books and articles about Tennessee, East Tennessee, and Knoxville.  In 1929, her article, "Carolina Traders Among the Overhill Cherokees, 1690–1760," appeared in the inaugural issue of the ETHS's annual Publications.  She edited the first major comprehensive history of Knox County and Knoxville, The French Broad-Holston County: A History of Knox County, Tennessee, in 1946.  She also wrote two school textbooks, Discovering Tennessee and This Is Tennessee: A School History.

Career
Rothrock became President of the Tennessee Librarian Association (TLA) in 1920 and was elected a second time in 1928. She organized and co-founded with Tommie Dora Barker and Charlotte Templeton the Southeastern Library Association (SELA) in Chattanooga in 1920 and became its first President. In 1946, she served as president of the American Library Association (ALA).

References

External links
Photograph of Rothrock and Mrs. Calvin M. McClung, 1958 –  Calvin M. McClung Historical Collection

 

1890 births
1976 deaths
American librarians
American women librarians
People from Giles County, Tennessee
People from Knoxville, Tennessee
Vanderbilt University alumni
People from Trenton, Tennessee
20th-century American women